Wildenstein Castle may refer to the following castles:
Château de Wildenstein, ruined castle in the Alsace region of France, situated in the commune of Kruth in the Haut-Rhin département
Wildenstein Castle (Bubendorf), castle in the municipality of Bubendorf in the canton of Basel-Land in Switzerland
Wildenstein Castle (Leibertingen), a castle in Baden-Württemberg, Germany
Wildenstein Castle (Palatinate), a ruined castle in Donnersbergkreis, Rhineland-Palatinate, Germany
 Wildenstein Castle (Aargau) in the Swiss Canton of Aargau
 Wildenstein Castle (Eschau) in German state of Bavaria
 Wildenstein Castle (Fichtenau) in the German state of Baden-Württemberg